This is a list of notable people coming from Republik Maluku Selatan.

Fashion designers
Oscar Lawalata - Indonesian fashion designer

Film, television and radio personalities
Nico Pelamonia - Indonesian film director

Musicians
Daniel Sahuleka - Dutch singer

Religious
Jefri Al Buchori - Islamic televangelist

Sports
Jos Luhukay - Dutch soccer manager
Ton Pattinama - Dutch soccer player
Sonny Silooy - Dutch soccer manager
Simon Tahamata - Dutch soccer player

See also

References

 01
Maluku Islands people
Maluku